Żabia Wola (will of the frog) may refer to the following places:
Żabia Wola, Gmina Głusk in Lublin Voivodeship (east Poland)
Żabia Wola, Gmina Strzyżewice in Lublin Voivodeship (east Poland)
Żabia Wola, Białobrzegi County in Masovian Voivodeship (east-central Poland)
Żabia Wola, Grodzisk Mazowiecki County in Masovian Voivodeship (east-central Poland)
Gmina Żabia Wola